The 9th congressional district of North Carolina is a congressional district in south-central North Carolina. The district's current boundaries were redrawn in February 2016 after a U.S. District Court overturned the existing boundaries because of politically directed gerrymandering that suppressed minority representation. The new congressional district consists of Union, Anson, Richmond, Scotland, and Robeson counties; a southeast portion of Mecklenburg County; and parts of Cumberland, Moore and Bladen counties.

Republicans have held this district since 1963.  Republican Robert Pittenger had represented the district since January 2013. In 2018, Pittenger was defeated by challenger Mark Harris in the Republican primary. The latter faced Democrat Dan McCready in the general election.

Harris was initially called as the winner by several hundred votes, but the result was not certified, pending a statewide investigation into allegations of absentee ballot fraud. On February 21, the bipartisan State Election Board unanimously voted to call for a new election for the 9th district, because of ballot fraud by Republican operatives.

A special election was held September 10, 2019, with Democrat Dan McCready running against Republican Dan Bishop, a state senator who won the Republican primary. Bishop won the 2019 special election to the U.S. House of Representatives with 50.7% of the vote to McCready's 48.7%.

Candidate filing began February 24, 2022 after the North Carolina Supreme Court approved a new map which changed the 9th district boundaries to include Chatham, Hoke, Lee, Moore, Randolph and Scotland Counties and parts of Cumberland, Harnett and Richmond Counties.

The ninth district is currently represented by Richard Hudson.

Counties 
Counties in the 2023-2025 district map.
 Chatham County
 Cumberland County (part)
 Harnett County (part)
 Hoke County
 Lee County
 Moore County
 Randolph County
 Richmond County (part)
 Scotland County

List of members representing the district

2018 election 

In the Republican primary incumbent Robert Pittenger was defeated by former pastor Mark Harris, who had closely challenged him two years earlier. Harris won 48.5 percent of the vote to Pittenger's 46.2 percent.

The New York Times described the election between Harris and Democrat Dan McCready as a "top-tier contest". In results on election day, Harris defeated McCready by 905 votes, but on November 27, 2018, the North Carolina State Board of Elections and Ethics Reform declined to certify the election results, citing voting irregularities involving absentee ballots. The irregularities in counting and handling of absentee ballots became the subject of a criminal investigation.

Outlets such as the Associated Press and FiveThirtyEight subsequently retracted calling the race, pending the decision of the state board of elections. On December 1, the chair of the state elections board resigned, saying: "The investigation of criminal conduct and absentee voting fraud in the 2018 Republican primary and 2018 general election in congressional district 9 is a matter of vital importance to our democracy", adding that "I will not allow myself to be used as an instrument of distraction in this investigation".

On November 30, the election board of the district decided to hear evidence about “claims of numerous irregularities and concerted fraudulent activities” at a meeting to be held by December 21. A finding of fraud could have resulted in a new election.

On December 5, 2018, independent investigative reporting of the alleged vote thefts detailed a practice that targeted southern rural elderly black voters in the 9th district congressional race and termed the affair, "...the  most serious federal election tampering case in years." Campaign workers revealed that the vote tampering went on in a pervasively chaotic atmosphere. Operatives tracked votes and field workers "...would come to your house, they would get you to fill out an absentee ballot to be sent to your house. They would go back and pick it up and then seal it and then find two witnesses," to certify their validity. Such handling of ballots and completed applications by other than board and postal workers is legally prohibited. An informant tabulated the number of ballots delivered to the county election board and said an indicted leader gave the Harris campaign updates on the operation's most recent totals. The leader was employed by Red Dome political consultants which received over $428,000 from the Harris campaign. The informant had delivered 185 absentee ballot applications and the leader personally delivered 592 more.  On December 6, Democratic candidate McCready withdrew his earlier submitted election concession. Republican candidate Harris agreed for a new election to be held if allegations of election fraud could be proven by the election board to have affected the contest's outcome. The leader of the North Carolina Republicans, Robin Hayes, stated on December 11 that, regardless to what extent election fraud could be proven to have altered the election, a new election would be necessary in the state's 9th congressional district if investigators can verify a local newspaper report that early voting results in Bladen County were leaked before Election Day.

On December 28, the state court dissolved the state election board, before it had certified election results. The election board's staff announced that it would continue the investigation, but delayed hearings until a new election board was seated, presumably on January 31. Democratic Governor Roy Cooper's attempts to fill an interim board were overridden by the Republican-controlled legislature. Incoming United States House of Representatives Majority Leader Steny Hoyer, a Democrat, announced that the House of Representatives would not seat Harris under any circumstances until the fraud investigation is completed. Harris announced he would seek court intervention to have him immediately certified as the winner and stated his intention to join the 116th Congress on January 3. However, Harris was not permitted to join the new Congress on January 3.

On February 21, the bipartisan state board of elections voted to hold a new election, because, according to board chairman Bob Cordle, "irregularities and improprieties ... tainted the results ... and cast doubt on its fairness." A newly passed law by the North Carolina state legislature will require the parties to hold new primaries before the general election for this seat. Harris has said that he will not run again.

2019 special election 

Democrat Dan McCready, a veteran and business executive, was unopposed as his party's nominee for this seat, following his narrow initial loss to Mark Harris in the election voided because of alleged ballot fraud by Republican operatives. After the Republicans conducted their primary, they nominated Dan Bishop, a North Carolina state senator, to run in the special election to be held in September 2019. On September 10, 2019, Bishop narrowly won the election with 50.7% of the vote to McCready's 48.7%. He was sworn in on September 17, 2019.

Recent election results

2012

2014

2016

2018

2019 special election

2020

2022

See also 

North Carolina's congressional districts
List of United States congressional districts

Notes

References 

Congressional Biographical Directory of the United States 1774–present

09